Benjamin E. Rossman is an American mathematician and theoretical computer scientist, specializing in computational complexity theory. He is currently an associate professor of computer science and mathematics at Duke University.

He graduated from the University of Pennsylvania with B.A. in 2001 and M.A. in 2002. He received in 2011 his Ph.D. with advisor Madhu Sudan from MIT with thesis Average-Case Complexity of Detecting Cliques. From 2010 to 2013 Rossman was a postdoc at the Tokyo Institute of Technology. From 2013 to 2016 he was an assistant professor in the Kawarabayashi Large Graph Project of the National Institute of Informatics. For the academic year 2014–2015 he was a Simons-Berkeley Research Fellow at the Simons Institute for the Theory of Computing. He was an assistant professor in the departments of mathematics and computer science of the University of Toronto until early 2019, before joining Duke University. In the fall of 2018 he was a visiting scientist at the Simons Institute for the Theory of Computing.

Rossman was a Sloan Research Fellow for the academic year 2017–2018. He won the Aisenstadt Prize in 2018. He was an invited speaker at the International Congress of Mathematicians in 2018 in Rio de Janeiro.

Selected publications

References

External links

1980 births
Living people
American computer scientists
Theoretical computer scientists
20th-century American mathematicians
21st-century American mathematicians
20th-century Canadian mathematicians
21st-century Canadian mathematicians
University of Pennsylvania alumni
Massachusetts Institute of Technology alumni
Academic staff of the University of Toronto
Sloan Research Fellows